Sahnun ibn Sa'id ibn Habib at-Tanukhi (c. 776/77 – 854/55) (160 AH – 240 AH ) was a jurist in the Maliki school from Qayrawan in modern-day Tunisia.

Biography
His original name was Abdu Salaam Ibn Said Ibn Habib He gained the nickname 'Sahnun' (a type of sharp bird) because of his quickness of mind. His father was a soldier from Homs in Syria. He was from the Arab tribe of Tanukh.

Life
In his youth Sahnun studied under the scholars of Qayrawan and Tunis. In particular, he learned from the Tripolitanian scholar `Ali bin Ziyad, who had learned from Imam Malik. In 178 AH he traveled to Egypt to study under other pupils of Malik, who died before Sahnun had the financial means to reach them. Later on he continued to Medina and studied under other prominent scholars, returning to North Africa in 191 AH.

Upon accepting the appointment, he was said to have told his daughter Khadija, "Today your father has been slain without a knife." He was known to be scrupulous in his judgments and courteous towards litigants and witnesses, but strict towards the men surrounding the emir; he refused to allow them to send representatives on their behalf in litigation, and refused a request from the emir not to interfere in their illegal ventures.

Theological Views
Sahnun was known  for his strong orthodoxy, even to the point of refusing to pray behind a Mu'tazilite imam. He excluded heretical sects from the mosque, including the Ibadi, Mu'tazilites and others. The Encyclopedia of Islam states:Hitherto, in the multiple circles of scholarship, representatives of all tendencies were able to express themselves freely in the Great Mosque of Kairouan. In a process amounting to a purging of the community of scholars there, Sahnun put an end to this "scandal". He dispersed the sects of the ahl al-bida; the leaders of heretical sects were paraded ignominiously, and some were compelled to recant in public. Sahnun was one of the greatest architects of the exclusive supremacy of Sunnism in its Maliki form throughout the Muslim West.

References

External links
 Excerpt from Qadi `Iyad's Tartib al Madarik

854 deaths
770s births
8th-century Arabs
9th-century Arabs
Arab scholars
9th-century Muslim theologians
People from Kairouan
Tanukhids
Tunisian imams
Tunisian Maliki scholars
Tunisian Sunni Muslims
Year of birth uncertain